Delphine de Vigan (born 1 March 1966) is a French novelist.

Life and career
De Vigan wrote her first four novels by night while working at a public opinion firm in Alfortville by day. Her first published work, Jours sans faim (2001), was published under the pseudonym Lou Delvig, although since then she has written under her own name.

Her breakthrough work was No et moi (2007), which won the Rotary International Prize in 2009 as well as France's prestigious Prix des libraires. The novel was translated into twenty languages and a film adaptation was released in 2010 (No et moi directed by Zabou Breitman). Following the book's success, she became a full-time professional writer.

In 2011, her novel Rien ne s'oppose à la nuit ("Nothing holds back the night"), which deals with a family coping with a woman's bipolar disorder, won another clutch of French literary prizes, including the prix du roman Fnac, the prix Roman France Télévisions, the Grand prix des lectrices de Elle, and the Prix Renaudot des lycéens.

Bibliography

Novels
Jours sans faim, Éditions Grasset, 2001 (under the pseudonym Lou Delvig)
Les Jolis Garçons, JC Lattès, 2005
Un soir de décembre, Jean-Claude Lattès, 2005
No et moi, Jean-Claude Lattès, 2007 (No and me, Bloomsbury 2010)
Sous le manteau, Flammarion, 2008 (contributor)
Les Heures souterraines, Jean-Claude Lattès, 2009 (Underground Time, Bloomsbury 2011)
Rien ne s'oppose à la nuit, Jean-Claude Lattès, 2011 (Nothing Holds Back the Night, Bloomsbury 2014)
D'après une histoire vraie, Jean-Claude Lattès, 2015 (Based on a True Story, Bloomsbury 2017)
Les Loyautés, Jean-Claude Lattès, 2018 (Loyalties, Bloomsbury 2019)
Les Gratitudes, Jean-Claude Lattès, 2019
Les enfants sont rois, Gallimard 2021

Screenplays
You Will Be My Son (2011) (with Gilles Legrand)

Decorations 
 Officer of the Order of Arts and Letters (10/02/2016).

Footnotes

People from Boulogne-Billancourt
1966 births
21st-century French novelists
21st-century French women writers
Prix Renaudot winners
Prix des libraires winners
Prix Goncourt des lycéens winners
Living people
Officiers of the Ordre des Arts et des Lettres